Bertil J. Lundman (September 28, 1899, Malmö – November 5, 1993) was a Swedish anthropologist.

Early life
Lundman was born on September 28, 1899, in Malmö.

Career
Lundman was an anthropologist. In the 1930s, he wrote an article in Zeitschrift für Rassenkunde, a German journal of racial studies. Later, he served on the executive committee of the International Association for the Advancement of Ethnology and Eugenics.

He created a racial classification system of Europeans in his book The Races and Peoples of Europe (1977).

Death
Lundman died on November 5, 1993.

Bibliography
Västmanland types, Christmas reading, Västmanland county newspaper (1931)
Folk type surveys in Dalarna I-IX, Dalarna homestead book (1932–38, 1940, 1946)
Nordic racial types, (1940)
Human Races and Tribes of the Earth, (1943–44)
The anthropology of the Dala common people (Doctoral dissertation), (1945)
On the Origin of the Lapps, Ethnos (1946)
Modern Human Races (1946)
Recent racial research in Finland (1946)
Races and Stocks in Baltoscandia (1946)
Ergebnisse der anthropologischen Lappenforchung, Anthropos (1952)
Outline of the Racism of Men in Historical Time (1952)
Tribal Studies der Völkers (1961)
Blutgruppenforschung und geograpische Anthropologie (1967)
Tribes of the Earth (1969)
The human races of the earth or the geographical variation of man through climatic adaptations and migrations (1969)
Concise Ethnogeography (1970)
The Races and Peoples of Europe (translation) (1977)
Memoirs (1987)

References

External links

1899 births
1993 deaths
People from Malmö
Swedish anthropologists
Anthropology writers
Proponents of scientific racism
Burials at Uppsala old cemetery
20th-century anthropologists